Cardenden railway station is a railway station in Cardenden, Fife, Scotland. It opened to traffic in 1848, on the Dunfermline Branch of the Edinburgh and Northern Railway.

The station is situated on Station Road, between the Bowhill and Dundonald areas. It can be accessed from the street by ramps or stairs. A footbridge connects the platforms.

The station is unmanned and there are no ticket vending facilities. Passengers boarding here must buy their tickets from staff on the train.

There is a small car park. The nearest public phone is at Bowhill Club, a short walk from the station. There are bus stops on Station Road.

The station has recently been upgraded with new platforms and a signage system giving accurate train times.

A CCTV system covers the station and is operated by ScotRail.

Cardenden was the terminus for train services until the line to Thornton re-opened in May 1989 allowing the "Fife Circle Line" to operate.  During the 1970s and early 1980s, the station was only served during the morning & early evening peak (trains outside these times starting/terminating at Cowdenbeath).

Services 

There is generally an hourly service in each direction along the Fife Circle Line westbound towards  or eastbound towards .  Additional services run at weekday peak times, with one in each direction (via Cowdenbeath) starting & finishing here.  Evening services start/terminate at  rather than running through to/from Edinburgh via the coast.

Services in both directions begin and end at Edinburgh Waverley. The journey to Edinburgh is quicker via Dunfermline (56 minutes) than via Kirkcaldy and the stations on the Fife coast (86 minutes).

On Sundays there is  an hourly service in each direction.

References

External links 

Railway stations in Fife
Former North British Railway stations
Railway stations in Great Britain opened in 1848
Railway stations served by ScotRail
1848 establishments in Scotland
Cardenden